The economy of Latvia is an open economy in Europe and is part of the European Single Market. Latvia is a member of the World Trade Organization (WTO) since 1999, a member of the European Union since 2004, a member of the Eurozone since 2014 and a member of the OECD since 2016. Latvia is ranked the 14th in the world by the Ease of Doing Business Index prepared by the World Bank Group. According to the Human Development Report 2011, Latvia belongs to the group of very high human development countries. Due to its geographical location, transit services are highly developed, along with timber and wood processing, agriculture and food products, and manufacturing of machinery and electronic devices.

Latvia's economy has had rapid GDP growth of more than 10% per year during 2006–07, but entered a severe recession in 2009 as a result of an unsustainable current account deficit, collapse of the real estate market, and large debt exposure amid the softening world economy. Triggered by the collapse of Parex Bank, the second largest bank, GDP decreased by almost 18% in 2009, and the European Union, the International Monetary Fund, and other international donors provided substantial financial assistance to Latvia as part of an agreement to defend the currency's peg to the euro in exchange for the government's commitment to stringent austerity measures.
In 2011 Latvia achieved GDP growth by 5.5% and thus Latvia again was among the fastest growing economies in the European Union. The IMF/EU program successfully concluded in December 2011.

Privatization is mostly complete, except for some of the large state-owned utilities. Export growth contributed to the economic recovery, however, the bulk of the country's economic activity is in the services sector.

Economic history

For centuries under Hanseatic and German influence and then during its inter-war independence, Latvia used its geographic location as an important east–west commercial and trading centre. Industry served local markets, while timber, paper and agricultural products were Latvia's main exports. Conversely, years in the Russian Empire and the Soviet Union tended to integrate Latvia's economy with their markets and also serve those countries' large internal industrial needs.

After reestablishing its independence, Latvia proceeded with market-oriented reforms, albeit at a measured pace. Its freely traded currency, the lat, was introduced in 1993 and held steady, or appreciated, against major world currencies. Inflation was reduced from 958.6% in 1992 to 25% by 1995 and 1.4% by 2002.

After contracting substantially between 1991 and 1995, the economy steadied in late 1994, led by a recovery in light industry and a boom in commerce and finance. This recovery was interrupted twice, first by a banking crisis and the bankruptcy of Banka Baltija, Latvia's largest bank, in 1995 and second by a severe crisis in the financial system of neighbouring Russia in 1998. After 2000, Latvian GDP grew by 6–8% a year for 4 consecutive years. Latvia's state budget was balanced in 1997 but the 1998 Russian financial crisis resulted in large deficits, which were reduced from 4% of GDP in 1999 to 1.8% in 2003. These deficits were smaller than in most of the other countries joining the European Union in 2004.

Until the middle of 2008, Latvia had the fastest developing economy in Europe. In 2003, GDP growth was 7.5% and inflation was 2.9%. The centrally planned system of the Soviet period was replaced with a structure based on free-market principles. In 2005, private sector share in GDP was 70%. Recovery in light industry and Riga's emergence as a regional financial and commercial centre offset shrinkage of the state-owned industrial sector and agriculture. The official unemployment figure was held steady in the 7%–10% range.

Economic contraction in 2008–2010

The financial crisis of 2007–2008 severely disrupted the Latvian economy, primarily as a result of the easy credit bubble that began building up during 2004. The bubble burst leading to a rapidly weakening economy, resulting in a budget, wage and unemployment crisis. Latvia had the worst economic performance in 2009, with annual growth rate averaging −18%.

The Latvian economy entered a phase of fiscal contraction during the second half of 2008 after an extended period of credit-based speculation and unrealistic inflation of real estate values. The national account deficit for 2007, for example, represented more than 22% of the GDP for the year while inflation was running at 10%.
By 2009 unemployment rose to 23% and was the highest in the EU.

Paul Krugman, the Nobel Laureate in economics for 2008, wrote in his New York Times Op-Ed column for 15 December 2008:

"The acutest problems are on Europe's periphery, where many smaller economies are experiencing crises strongly reminiscent of past crises in Latin America and Asia: Latvia is the new Argentina".

By August 2009, Latvia's GDP had fallen by 20% year on year, with Standard & Poor's predicting a further 16% contraction to come. The International Monetary Fund suggested a devaluation of Latvia's currency, but the European Union objected to this, on the grounds that the majority of Latvia's debt was denominated in foreign currencies. Financial economist Michael Hudson has advocated for redenominating foreign currency liabilities in Latvian lats before devaluing.

However, by 2010 there were indications that Latvia's policy of internal devaluation was successful.

Economic recovery 2010–2012

The economic situation has since 2010 improved, and by 2012 Latvia was described as a success by IMF managing director Christine Lagarde showing strong growth forecasts. The Latvian economy grew by 5.5% in 2011 and by 5.6% in 2012 reaching the highest rate of growth in Europe. The GDP surpassed the pre-crisis level in 2018.

Privatisation
Privatisation in Latvia is almost complete. Virtually all of the previously state-owned small and medium companies have been privatized, leaving only a small number of politically sensitive large state companies. In particular, the country's main energy and utility company, Latvenergo remains state-owned and there are no plans to privatize it. The government also holds minority shares in Ventspils Nafta oil transit company and the country's main telecom company Lattelecom but it plans to relinquish its shares in the near future.

Foreign investment in Latvia is still modest compared with the levels in north-central Europe. A law expanding the scope for selling land, including land sales to foreigners, was passed in 1997. Representing 10.2% of Latvia's total foreign direct investment, American companies invested $127 million in 1999. In the same year, the United States exported $58.2 million of goods and services to Latvia and imported $87.9 million. Eager to join Western economic institutions like the World Trade Organization, OECD, and the European Union, Latvia signed a Europe Agreement with the EU in 1995 with a 4-year transition period. Latvia and the United States have signed treaties on investment, trade, and intellectual property protection and avoidance of double taxation.

Employment 

Average wages are higher in Riga and its surroundings and in Ventspils and its surroundings, with inland border regions lacking behind, mainly the region of Latgale.

Sectors

Primary

Agriculture 

Latvia produced in 2018:

 1.4 million tons of wheat;
 426 thousand tons of potato;
 306 thousand tons of barley;
 229 thousand tons of rapeseed;
 188 thousand tons of oat;
 81 thousand tons of rye;
 80 thousand tons of bean;

In addition to smaller productions of other agricultural products.

Manufacturing 
Ogres Knitwear, since 1965

Services

Infrastructure

Energy 

Almost all of Latvian electricity is produced with Hydroelectricity. Biggest hydroelectric power stations are Pļaviņas Hydroelectric Power Station, Riga Hydroelectric Power Plant, Ķegums Hydroelectric Power Station. 
In 2017 about 4381 GWh were produced in hydro power and 150 GWh in wind power. There is a steady increase in Wind electricity production, and by 2022 the biggest wind farm is supposed to open which would produce 0.7 terawatt hours of energy (10% of country total)

Latvia imports 100% of its natural gas from Russia.

Transport 

Key ports are located in Riga (Freeport of Riga and Riga Passenger Terminal), Ventspils (Free port of Ventspils), and Liepāja (Port of Liepāja). Most transit traffic uses these and half the cargo is crude oil and oil products.

Latvian Railways is the main state-owned railway company in Latvia. Its daughter companies both carry out passengers services as well as carry a large quantity of freight cargo, and freight trains operate over the whole current passenger network, and a number of lines currently closed to passenger services.

Riga International Airport is the only major airport in Latvia, carrying around 5 million passengers annually. It is the largest airport in the Baltic states and has direct flights to over 80 destinations in 30 countries. It is also the main hub of airBaltic.

Statistics

Household income or consumption by percentage share:
lowest 10%:
2.9%
highest 10%:
25.9% (1998)

Industries:
synthetic fibres, agricultural machinery, fertilizers, radios, electronics, pharmaceuticals, processed foods, textiles, timber; note – dependent on imports for energy and raw materials

Industrial production growth rate:
8.5% (2004 est.)

Electricity – production:
4,547 GWh (2002)

Electricity – production by source:
fossil fuel:
29.1%
hydro:
70.9%
nuclear:
0%
other:
0% (2001)

Electricity – consumption:
5,829 GWh (2002)

Electricity – exports:
1,100 GWh (2002)

Electricity – imports:
2,700 GWh (2002)

Agriculture – products:
wheat, barley, potatoes, vegetables; beef, milk, eggs; fish

Foreign direct investments in Latvia:
Lursoft statistics on the remaining amount of investments at the end of each year. 

Packet of 20 cigarettes: On Average 3.30 – 4.50 EUR.

See also
Baltic Tiger
Baltic states housing bubble
Economy of Europe

References

External links
 Latvia's Tiger Economy Loses Its Bite by Kristina Rizga, The Nation, 28 October 2009
 Latvia's Internal Devaluation: A Success Story?, from the Center for Economic and Policy Research, December 2011
 European Commission's DG ECFIN's country page on Latvia.
 World Bank Summary Trade Statistics 2012

 
Latvia
Latvia
Latvia